Janusz Adam Onyszkiewicz (born 18 December 1937) is a Polish mathematician, alpinist, politician and was a vice-president of the European Parliament's Foreign Affairs Committee from January 2007 until mid-2009.

Biographical note
Janusz Onyszkiewicz was born in Lwów (then Poland, now Lviv, Ukraine). He graduated in mathematics from Warsaw University. He became a mathematician, and was also known as an alpinist in the 1970s along with his wife Alison Chadwick-Onyszkiewicz. In the 1980s, he became the spokesman for the anti-communist Solidarity movement. He became popular among foreign journalists because of his fluent English. After the introduction of martial law in Poland on 13 December 1981, he was arrested and interned.

After the fall of communism in 1989, Onyszkiewicz became a member of the Polish Sejm. He served all subsequent terms from May 1989 until 2001. In the spring of 1990, Onyszkiewicz and Bronisław Komorowski became the first civilian vice-ministers of defence in the communist-dominated Ministry of Defence. Later, Onyszkiewicz was Minister of Defence twice, in the cabinets of Hanna Suchocka (1992–1993) and Jerzy Buzek (1997–2000).

Initially, he was a member of the Obywatelski Klub Parlamentarny, then the Democratic Union and the Freedom Union. Today, he is a member of the Democratic Party, the continuation of Democratic Union.

In 1999, Onyszkiewicz was awarded the Manfred Wörner Medal by the German Minister of Defence.

On 13 June 2004, Onyszkiewicz was elected to the European Parliament as a candidate of Democratic Union in the 10th constituency (Lesser Poland+Swietokrzyskie Voivodeships) receiving 50 155 votes (6,37%). On 20 July 2004 he was elected a vice-president of the European Parliament. 
Onyszkiewicz is Chairman of the ICDT's International Board of Directors.

References

Onuszkiewicz's page for elections to the European Parliament

See also

 2004 European Parliament election in Poland

Politicians from Lviv
Ministers of National Defence of Poland
Polish mountain climbers
University of Warsaw alumni
Members of the Polish Sejm 1991–1993
Members of the Polish Sejm 1993–1997
Members of the Polish Sejm 1997–2001
1937 births
Living people
Democratic Party – demokraci.pl politicians
Freedom Union (Poland) MEPs
MEPs for Poland 2004–2009
Polish Round Table Talks participants
Recipients of the Order of the Cross of Terra Mariana, 2nd Class